Pfalzen (Ladin: Falzes) is a comune (municipality) in South Tyrol in northern Italy, located about  northeast of Bolzano.

Geography

Pfalzen borders the following municipalities: Bruneck, Kiens, Gais, St. Lorenzen and Mühlwald.

Frazioni
The municipality of Pfalzen contains the frazioni (subdivisions, mainly villages and hamlets) Greinwalden (Grimaldo) and Issing (Issengo).

History

Coat-of-arms
The escutcheon is party per pale of gules and argent; with a sickle in each side of opposite color.  It is the coat of arms of the Plazoll zu Assling, Lords of Pfalzen in the Middle Ages, who built the castle of Sichelburg (sichel in German means sickle). The emblem was adopted in 1967.

Society

Linguistic distribution
According to the 2011 census, 96.25% of the population speak German, 2.36% Italian and 1.39% Ladin as first language.

Demographic evolution

Notable people
 Fabian Aichner - professional wrestler
 Luis Durnwalder - former Governor of South Tyrol (1989–2014)

References

External links

 Homepage of the municipality

Municipalities of South Tyrol